Lazovsky (masculine), Lazovskaya (feminine), or Lazovskoye (neuter) may refer to:
Maxim Lazovsky (1965–200), Russian KGB officer
Lazovsky District, a district of Primorsky Krai, Russia